Samuel Marshall "Mike" Wilson (December 2, 1896 – May 16, 1978) was a professional football and professional baseball player. He played four seasons in the National Football League (NFL) and the first American Football League between 1922 and 1926, and part of one Major League Baseball season in 1921.

Football 
A native of Edge Hill, Pennsylvania, he played college football for Lehigh and professional football in the NFL as an end and back. He appeared in 17 NFL games, 16 as a starter. In 1922 Wilson was an end with the NFL's Buffalo All-Americans however he finished the season with the Rochester Jeffersons. In 1923, he played for the Rock Island Independents. While Wilson took a break from football in 1925, he was a played once again in 1926 with the Independents, which were now playing in the AFL.

Baseball 
Wilson played five games as a catcher for the Pittsburgh Pirates in 1921, going hitless in four at bats. He continued to play in the minors until 1928 before retiring.

References

Sources

Major League Baseball catchers
Pittsburgh Pirates players
Buffalo All-Americans players
Rochester Jeffersons players
Rock Island Independents players
Rock Island Independents (AFL) players
Des Moines Boosters players
Newark Bears (IL) players
Pittsfield Hillies players
Bridgeport Bears (baseball) players
New Haven Profs players
Scranton Miners players
Salisbury Indians players
Rochester Tribe players
Williamsport Grays players
Wilkes-Barre Barons (baseball) players
Syracuse Orangemen baseball players
Lehigh Mountain Hawks baseball players
Lehigh Mountain Hawks football players
Players of American football from Pennsylvania
Baseball players from Pennsylvania
1896 births
1978 deaths